Smirnov is a Russian surname.

Smirnov or Smirnova may also refer to:

Smirnov (volcano) at  Kunashir Island, Kuril Islands, Russia
Smirnov Peak, Queen Maud Land, Antarctica
Dorsa Smirnov, wrinkle ridge system on the Moon
5540 Smirnova, minor planet

See also
74P/Smirnova–Chernykh, periodic comet in Solar System
Smirnoff (disambiguation)